Australia–Hong Kong relations are distinct to Australia-China relations. Hong Kong has the status of a Special Administrative Region of the People's Republic of China, and maintains its own international relations including those with Australia, as it is empowered to do under the Hong Kong Basic Law. Australia supports the Sino-British Joint Declaration, Hong Kong's mini-constitution, the Basic Law, and in accordance with China's policy of observing "one country, two systems". On the other hand, mainland China has stated that Hong Kong is within China's internal affairs.

Australia has extensive and enduring economic interests in Hong Kong.

Hong Kong maintains a Hong Kong Economic and Trade Office, located in Hong Kong House, Sydney.

Both Australia and Hong Kong were former British colonies and Australia has strong ties with Hong Kong.

History

The first interaction between Australians and southern Chinese was during the Australian gold rushes in the 1850s, with British Hong Kong being the point of departure for immigrants from southern China. White migration within the British empire continued along the sea lines of communication between Hong Kong, Singapore, Australia/New Zealand.

After federation of Australia in 1901, Australia adopted the White Australia policy and passed the Immigration Restriction Act 1901 which limited non-white immigration (including Eurasians) to Australia. Ethnic Chinese immigration resumed slowly as the White Australia policy was wound back during the 1950s and 1960s.

Australians have filled senior and mid-level posts in tertiary institutions and the Hong Kong government. HKU physiologist Lindsay Ride of Newstead, Victoria, established and commanded the British Army Aid Group during the Second World War. Philip Haddon-Cave of Hobart, Tasmania continued the Hong Kong government policy of positive non-intervention during his tenure as Hong Kong Financial Secretary.

Bilateral agreements
Articles 151, 153 and 155 of Hong Kong Basic Law permits Hong Kong to conclude non-military bilateral agreements with foreign countries, while article 152 permits Hong Kong to join international organisations.

Both Hong Kong and Australia are full members of APEC and FATF, (China has its own membership) and are bilateral participants on air services agreement (since 1993), Investment Promotion and Protection Agreement (since October 1993) superseded by the Australia - Hong Kong Investment Agreement (2019), Mutual Legal Assistance Agreement (since 1999), Surrender of Fugitive Offenders Agreement (since June 1997), Transfer of Sentenced Persons Agreement (since 2006).

Following the imposition by mainland China of a national security law upon Hong Kong, which Australia regards as being in breach of the Hong Kong Basic Law, on 7 July, the Australian government issued an official travel advisory warning travellers and Australian passport holders residing in Hong Kong, advising the latter group: “If you’re concerned about the new law, reconsider your need to remain in Hong Kong." On 9 July 2020, Australia suspended its extradition agreement with Hong Kong, which had been in place since 1993 and offered to extend visas by five years for Hong Kong residents currently in the country, and opening a pathway to permanent residency for up to 10,000 people working and studying in Australia.

Political relationships 
Australia's policy toward Hong Kong is underpinned by its substantial commercial interests, and by the presence of a large Australian community living in Hong Kong.

Article 82 of Hong Kong Basic Law permits Hong Kong to invite judges from other common law jurisdictions to sit on the Court of Final Appeal. The Hong Kong Government continues to hire and appoint Australians, with or without the right of abode in Hong Kong, to senior posts in the Hong Kong Judiciary. Former Hong Kong Directors of Public Prosecutions, Ian McWalters and Kevin Zervos, were appointed as High Court judges in 2011 and 2013 respectively, and both were subsequently elevated to the Court of Appeal in 2014 and 2018 respectively. Sir Anthony Mason, Murray Gleeson, James Spigelman, William Gummow and Robert French have been appointed to the Court of Final Appeal as Non-Permanent Judges from other common law jurisdictions.

The Australian Consulate-General represents the Australian Government in Hong Kong. Some Australian states havetrade or business offices in Hong Kong, including Queensland and Victoria. Hong Kong is not permitted under the Basic Law to have diplomatic relations with other countries, but maintains the Hong Kong Economic and Trade Office in Sydney, Australia.

Trade and investment 

Australia's commercial interests in Hong Kong are extensive and range from banking, accounting, legal, engineering, information technology services and retail and general trading. Around 550 Australian companies are based in Hong Kong, and a further 1,000 Australian companies have representative offices.

Cultural 
Some 90,000 Australians are resident in Hong Kong. According to the 2016 Census, 86 886 people of Hong Kong origin live in Australia, with 280 943 Cantonese speakers in Australia, the largest number after Mandarin Chinese and Arabic. The majority Hong Kong immigrants live in Sydney and Melbourne.

Australia is one of the major English-speaking study destinations for students from Hong Kong due to monetary factors; while the Australian government is encouraging an enhanced two-way student mobility through the New Colombo Plan educational exchange.

Tourism
Both Australia and Hong Kong have offered "Working Holiday Programs" without quota restriction for maximum of 12-months since September 2001. The programme allows students to holiday in Hong Kong or Australia and to take temporary employment as needed to cover the expenses of their visit. The programme aims to increase travel by young people between Australia and Hong Kong and to strengthen the links between the two regions.

In popular culture 
British satirical comedy The Day Today featured news coverage of a fictional trade agreement between Australia and Hong Kong. Host Chris Morris's impression of Jeremy Paxman's combative interview style swiftly led to the outbreak of war in Eastmanstown, on the "Australio-Hong Kong border".

See also 

 Hong Kong Australian
 Australian Consulate-General, Hong Kong and Macau
 Australians in Hong Kong
 Foreign relations of Hong Kong
 Foreign relations of Australia

References 
 Citations

 Attributions
 With the exception of the Commonwealth Coat of Arms and where otherwise noted, all material presented on this website is provided under a Creative Commons Attribution 3.0 Australia licence.

External links 

 Australian Consulate-General Hong Kong Official Site

 
Hong Kong
Hong Kong and the Commonwealth of Nations